The Pope Villa in Lexington, Kentucky, USA, was designed by Benjamin Henry Latrobe in 1811 for Senator John Pope. It is one of only three extant Latrobe residences in the United States. As one of Latrobe's most avant-garde designs, the Pope Villa has national significance for its architect and unique design.
 
Purchased in 1987 by the Blue Grass Trust for Historic Preservation, the Pope Villa underwent restoration in the 2010s to reflect its 1811 original construction appearance.  It was listed on the National Register of Historic Places in 2018.

References

External links

"The Domestic Architecture of Benjamin Henry Latrobe" by Michael W. Fazio and Patrick A. Snadon (includes several photographs)
Pope Villa

Benjamin Henry Latrobe buildings and structures
Houses completed in 1811
Houses in Lexington, Kentucky
National Register of Historic Places in Lexington, Kentucky
Houses on the National Register of Historic Places in Kentucky
1811 establishments in Kentucky